Adolf Míšek (29 August 1875 Modletin – 20 October 1955 Prague) was a Czech double bassist and composer of the late romantic era.

Life 

Born in Modletín (then a part of the Austro-Hungarian Empire), he left for Vienna at the age of 15 to study with Franz Simandl at the Vienna Conservatory. At the age of 23 Míšek joined the orchestra of the state opera in Vienna - a post he held concurrently with the professorship at the conservatory after the departure of Simandl in 1910-1914. After the World War I he left for Prague in 1920 to join the National Theatre as principal bassist and soloist. He taught also at the Prague Conservatory 1920-1934.

Works

Compositions for double bass 
 Capriccio (1899)
 Concert Polonaise (1903)
 Legenda op. 3 (1903)
 Sonata in A major op. 5 (1909)
 Sonata in E minor op. 6 (1911)
 Sonata in F major op. 7 (rev. 1955)

Chamber music 
 Kinderherzen op. 21 for violin (1903)
 Drei Tonstücke op. 22 for violin (1904)
 Sonatinka pro housle ve snadném slohu (for violin)
 Sonata for violin in E major
 Sonatina for violoncello
 Idyla for violoncello
 Piano trio op. 20 (1904)
 String quartet in A major
 String quartet in D major
 String quintet in E flat major (2v, vla, vc, cb)

Songs 
 Čtverlístek písní op. 11
 Zdrávas Maria
 Čtvero písní (1930)

Pedagogic literature 
 Method for scales and arpeggios for double bass with piano

Míšek wrote arrangements of Czech folk songs for choir, arranged various pieces for violin and double bass and he composed couple of marches and other pieces for wind ensembles.

Sources 
 Seznam děl v Souborném katalogu ČR, jejichž autorem nebo tématem je Adolf Mišek
 Československý hudební slovník osob a institucí II. (M–Ž), 1965, Státní hudební vydavatelství, Praha
 Alfred Planyavsky, Herbert Seifert: Geschichte des Kontrabasses. Schneider, Tutzing 1984, .
 Friedrich Warnecke: Ad infinitum. Der Kontrabass. Seine Geschichte und seine Zukunft. Probleme und deren Lösung zur Hebung des Kontrabaßspiels. Autograph of the first print from 1909, Leipzig 2005, .

1875 births
1955 deaths
Czech classical composers
Czech male classical composers
Czech choral conductors